The 1976–77 British Ice Hockey season featured the Northern League for teams from Scotland and the north of England and the Southern League for teams from the rest of England. 

Fife Flyers won the Northern League and Streatham Redskins won the Southern League. Fife Flyers won the Icy Smith Cup.

Northern League

Regular season

(*The Dundee Rockets played all games away for four points per match.)

Southern League

Regular season

Midland Section

Southern Section

Final
Streatham Redskins defeated Altrincham Aces 12:2 on aggregate (6:2, 6:0)

Spring Cup

Final
Won by the Fife Flyers

Icy Smith Cup

Final
Fife Flyers defeated Southampton Vikings 9-5 & 18-6

Autumn Cup

(*Played all games away for four points per match.)

References

British
1976 in English sport
1977 in English sport
1976 in Scottish sport
1977 in Scottish sport